Derone Davis (born 14 October 1992) is a West Indies cricketer. He was in the West Indies Under-19 squad for the 2012 ICC Under-19 Cricket World Cup. In June 2021, he was selected to take part in the Minor League Cricket tournament in the United States following the players' draft.

References

1992 births
Living people
Trinidad and Tobago cricketers
Combined Campuses and Colleges cricketers
Saint Lucia Kings cricketers
Trinbago Knight Riders cricketers